The Prebaetic System ( or Sistema Prebético, also often referred to simply as Prebético) is a system of mountain ranges that forms the northeasternmost prolongation of the Baetic System in the southern Iberian Peninsula.

Geography
Although it is sometimes referred to as Cordillera Prebética, it is not a proper cordillera, or continuous alignment of ranges, but a broken system of mountain ranges.
Unlike the other two subsystems of the Baetic System, it is not present in the western area, but begins west of the eastern edge of the Sierra Sur de Jaén near Martos.

The Prebaetic System runs along eastern interior Andalusia, across the Region of Murcia, reaching the Mediterranean Sea shores in the southern Valencian Community.

Its highest point is La Sagra, Sierra de la Sagra; other high ranges are Sierra de Segura and Sierra de Cazorla.
The Sierra de María in northern Almeria Province runs across the Prebaetic and the Penibaetic System, overlapping with both.

Geology
Geologically the Prebaetic System shares similar characteristics to its parent system, the Subbaetic System and it is considered its eastern offshoot. The materials that compose it were formed in a relatively shallow sea.
The Iberian System rises north of the eastern part of the Prebaetic System.

Main mountain ranges
Some of the mountain ranges that make up the Prebaetic complex are, from west to east:
Sierra Sur de Jaén, overlapping with the Sistema Subbético
Sierra Mágina
Sierra de la Sagra
Sierra de Cazorla
Sierra de Segura
Sierra de Alcaraz
Sierra de Castril
Sierra de Cabrilla
Sierra Seca
Sierra del Taibilla
Sierra de María, overlapping with the Sistema Penibético.
Serra de Crevillent
Sierra de Orihuela
Sierra de Callosa
Serra Mariola
Serra del Ferrer
La Carrasqueta
Puig Campana
Aitana
Maigmó Massif
Serrella
Serra de la Xortà
Serra de la Penya-roja
Montgó Massif
Sierra de Bernia
Penyal d'Ifac

See also 
Baetic System
Geography of Spain
Geology of the Iberian Peninsula

References

External links
Cuenca del Guadalquivir
Past and present potential distribution of the Iberian Abies species: a phytogeographic approach using fossil pollen data and species distribution models
Michael Deusch, Axel Friebe & Manfred Krautter (1991): The Spongiolithic Facies in the Middle and Upper Jurassic of Spain - Abstract

Baetic System
Mountain ranges of Andalusia
Mountain ranges of the Region of Murcia
Mountain ranges of the Valencian Community